The 2023 Big West Conference men's basketball tournament is the postseason men's basketball tournament for the Big West Conference of the 2022–23 NCAA Division I men's basketball season. It is to be held March 7–11, 2023, at the Dollar Loan Center in Henderson, Nevada. The winner will receive the conference's automatic bid to the 2023 NCAA tournament.

Seeds
Of the 11 conference teams, 10 are eligible for the tournament. UC San Diego is ineligible for the tournament, as it is in the third year of the four-year transition required for teams transferring to Division I from Division II. Teams are seeded based on their performance within the conference, and teams with identical conference records are seeded using a tiebreaker system. Unlike previous years before 2020, teams are no longer reseeded before the semifinals.

Schedule and results

Bracket

References

Big West Conference men's basketball tournament
Tournament
Big West Conference men's basketball tournament
Big West Conference men's basketball tournament
Sports competitions in Henderson, Nevada
Basketball competitions in the Las Vegas Valley
College basketball tournaments in Nevada
College sports tournaments in Nevada